Acacia brachyphylla is a shrub of the genus Acacia and the subgenus Plurinerves that is endemic to a small area in south western Australia.

Description
Like most species of Acacia it has phyllodes rather than true leaves. It blooms from August to October and produces yellow flowers. The simple inflorescences occur singly or in pairs and have spherical flower-heads with a diameter of  containing 8 to 12 golden coloured flowers. Following flowering thinly coriaceous to firmly chartaceous seed pods have a linear shape.

Taxonomy
There are two recognised varieties:
Acacia brachyphylla var. brachyphylla
Acacia brachyphylla var. recurvata

Distribution
It is native to an area in the Wheatbelt and Great Southern regions of Western Australia where it is commonly situated on sandplains growing in gravelly and sandy loam soils. The range of the plant extends from around Tammin in the north west to around Jerramungup in the south east.

See also
 List of Acacia species

References

brachyphylla
Acacias of Western Australia
Taxa named by George Bentham
Plants described in 1855